Lar is a town and union council in Dera Ismail Khan District of Khyber-Pakhtunkhwa. It is located at 32°5'30N 71°4'15E and has an altitude of 184 metres (606 feet).

References

Union councils of Dera Ismail Khan District
Populated places in Dera Ismail Khan District